Francisco Alcíbiades García Lizardi (born 17 December 1941) is a Mexican politician affiliated with the Convergence. As of 2013 he served as Senator of the LX and LXI Legislatures of the Mexican Congress representing Veracruz.

References

1941 births
Living people
People from Mexicali
Members of the Senate of the Republic (Mexico)
Citizens' Movement (Mexico) politicians
21st-century Mexican politicians
Politicians from Baja California
National Autonomous University of Mexico alumni